The Jean-Pierre Bay is a freshwater body of the south-eastern part of the Gouin Reservoir, in the territory of the town of La Tuque, in Haute-Mauricie, in the administrative region of Mauricie, in the province of Quebec, in Canada.

This bay is mainly included in the township of Leblanc and Aubin. Following the erection completed in 1948 of the Gouin Dam, the "Jean-Pierre Bay" was formed by the raising of the waters of the Jean-Pierre River (Gouin Reservoir). Since 1948, Jean-Pierre Bay has been an extension of the Brochu Lake further north-west, at the extreme east of the Gouin Reservoir.

Recreotourism activities are the main economic activity of the sector. Forestry comes second. A civilian seaplane base is located at the top of the Gouin Dam.

Some secondary forest roads are in use nearby for forestry and recreational tourism activities.

The surface of Jean-Pierre Bay is usually frozen from mid-November to the end of April, however, safe ice circulation is generally from early December to the end of March.

Geography

Toponymy 
This hydronym is a name of French origin.

The toponym "Baie Jean-Pierre" was officialized on August 2, 1991 by the Commission de toponymie du Québec.

Notes and references

See also 

Bays of Quebec
La Tuque, Quebec